Muruta is a small genus of southeast Asian cellar spiders named after the Murut people. It was erected in 2018 for two species transferred from Pholcus after a molecular phylogenetic study of Pholcidae. Males can be distinguished from other species by hairless, flat sclerites on their chelicerae, and females can be distinguished by three-layered telescopic tubes in their genital structure.  it contains only two species, both native to northern Borneo: M. bario and M. tambunan.

See also
 Pholcus
 List of Pholcidae species

References

Pholcidae genera
Arthropods of Borneo